A Marian apparition is a reported supernatural appearance by Mary, the mother of Jesus, or a series of related such appearances during a period of time.

In the Catholic Church, in order for a reported appearance to be classified as a Marian apparition, the person or persons who claim to see Mary (the "seers") must claim that they see her visually located in their environment. If the person claims to hear Mary but not see her, this is known as an interior locution, not an apparition. Also excluded from the category of apparitions are dreams, visions experienced in the imagination, the claimed perception of Mary in ordinarily-explainable natural phenomena, and miracles associated with Marian artwork, such as weeping statues.

Believers consider such apparitions to be real and objective interventions of divine power, rather than subjective experiences generated by the perceiving individuals, even in cases where the apparition is reportedly seen by only some, not all, of the people present at the event's location.

Marian apparitions are considered expressions of Mary's ongoing motherly care for the church. The understood purpose of each apparition is to draw attention to some aspect of the Christian message, given the needs of a particular time and place. Apparitions are often accompanied by other alleged supernatural phenomena, such as medical cures. However, such miraculous events are not considered the purpose of Marian apparitions, but are alleged to exist primarily to validate and draw attention to the message.

Examples

Each Marian apparition is often associated with one or more titles given to Mary, often based on the location of the apparition, such as Our Lady of Pontmain in Pontmain, France (1871). Others are named using a title which Mary purportedly applies to herself during the alleged apparition, as in the case of the disputed apparition entitled The Lady of All Nations (Netherlands, 1945..1959).

Some Marian apparitions have only one purported seer, such as that of Our Lady of Lourdes (France, 1858). Other apparitions have multiple seers; in the case of Our Lady of Fatima (1917), there were only three seers of the apparition itself, but miraculous phenomena were reported by a crowd of approximately 70,000 people, and even by others located miles away. In other cases, the entirety of a large group of people claims to see Mary, as in the case of Our Lady of La Vang (Vietnam, c. 1800). Some modern mass apparitions, claimed to have been witnessed by hundreds of thousands, have also allegedly been photographed, such as Our Lady of Zeitoun (Egypt, 1968..1971).

Most alleged apparitions involve the verbal communication of messages, but others are silent, such as the apparition of Our Lady of Knock (Ireland, 1879).

Some apparitions are one-time events, such as Our Lady of La Salette (France, 1846). Others recur over an extended period of time, such as Our Lady of Laus (France, 17th/18th centuries), whose seer claimed 54 years of appearances. Public, serial apparitions (in which a seer not only says that they have experienced a vision, but that they expect it will reoccur, causing people to gather to observe) appear to be a relatively recent phenomenon; up until about the seventeenth century, most reported apparitions happened when the individual was alone, or at least no one else was aware of its occurrence.

Physical contact is hardly ever reported as part of Marian apparitions. In rare cases, a physical artifact is reportedly left behind, such as the image of Our Lady of Guadalupe (Mexico, 1531), which is said to have been miraculously imprinted on the cloak of Juan Diego.

Assessment by the Catholic Church

The Catholic Church believes that it is possible for actually-supernatural Marian apparitions to occur, but also believes that many claimed apparitions are fabricated by the seer or the result of something other than divine intervention. For this reason, the Catholic Church has a formal evaluation process established for assessing claimed apparitions.

Investigations into alleged apparitions can be carried out by the local ordinary (i.e. diocesan bishop), the national episcopal conference, or the Holy See. Apparitions are evaluated on multiple criteria, including the sincerity and moral uprightness of the seers, the theological accuracy of the messages, and positive spiritual benefits resulting from the apparition event.

Occasionally, an ecclesial authority will decide not to investigate the veracity of an apparition in itself, but will approve the religious practices that have grown around the alleged apparition, such as by authorizing public veneration connected with the apparition, or by granting a request contained in the apparition messages. Pope Leo XIII, for example, authorized the use of a scapular described in the messages of Our Lady of Pellevoisin (France, 1876), but did not pass judgment on the supernatural character of the apparition itself.

Even if a Catholic bishop approves an apparition, belief in the apparition is never required of the Catholic faithful. The Catholic faith is based on so-called Public Revelation, which ended with the death of the last living Apostle. A Marian apparition, however, is considered private revelation, which may emphasize some facet of the received public revelation for a specific purpose, but can never add anything new to the deposit of faith.

In the Catholic Church, approval of a Marian apparition is relatively rare. The majority of investigated apparitions are rejected as fraudulent or otherwise false. Recently rejected apparition claims include those of "Our Lady of Surbiton," denounced as fraudulent in 2007, and those associated with Holy Love Ministries in Elyria, Ohio, condemned in 2009. Some whose apparition claims are rejected secede from the Catholic Church as a result and initiate new groups, as for the case of the Mariavite Church, the Palmarian Catholic Church, and the Fraternité Notre-Dame.

Cultural impact

Marian apparitions, particularly those that are approved officially, often affect Christian piety and the general public. Apparitions can become a part of national identity, as Our Lady of Guadalupe is for the majority-Catholic population of Mexico.

In many cases, apparition seers report a request from Mary for the construction of a shrine on the place of the apparition. Such Marian shrines often become popular sites of pilgrimage. The most-visited Marian shrine in the world is the Basilica of Our Lady of Guadalupe in Mexico City, which draws 10 million pilgrims each year. Other popular apparition-related Marian pilgrimage sites include the Sanctuary of Our Lady of Fátima in Portugal (6–8 million per year) and the Sanctuary of Our Lady of Lourdes in France (5 million annually).

Apparitions often result in the establishment of Marian confraternities, movements, and societies that seek to heed and spread the messages of a particular apparition, such as the Blue Army of Our Lady of Fátima.

Occasionally, apparitions will introduce prayers that become incorporated into widespread Catholic practice, as for the case of the Fátima prayers, or the legendary revelation of the Rosary to Saint Dominic.

References

Further reading
 
 
 
 
 
 
 Maunder, Chris. Our Lady of the Nations: Apparitions of Mary in 20th-century Catholic Europe, Oxford University Press, 2016 
 Zimdars-Swartz, Sandra L., Encountering Mary: From La Salette to Medjugorje, Princeton University Press, 2014, 

Marian apparitions
Catholic Mariology
Anglican Mariology
Christian miracles
Christian terminology
Paranormal